Tejs Broberg (born 15 March 1976) is a Danish alpine skier. He competed in three events at the 1998 Winter Olympics.

References

1976 births
Living people
Danish male alpine skiers
Olympic alpine skiers of Denmark
Alpine skiers at the 1998 Winter Olympics
Place of birth missing (living people)